County routes in Orleans County, New York, are not signed in any form, serving as little more than references for inventory purposes. A single road may—and often does—have multiple designations for different segments of the road. Parts of two New York state routes—New York State Route 237 and New York State Route 279—are maintained by Orleans County and are assigned county route designations for inventory purposes.

Routes 1–50

Routes 51 and up

See also

County routes in New York

References